Hacking at Random was an outdoor hacker conference that took place in the Netherlands from August 13 to August 16, 2009.

It was situated on a large camp-site near the small town Vierhouten in the Netherlands called the Paasheuvel.

This conference was the second most recent event in a sequence that began with the Galactic Hacker Party in 1989, followed by Hacking at the End of the Universe in 1993, Hacking In Progress in 1997, Hackers At Large in 2001, and What the Hack in 2005, and succeeded by Observe. Hack. Make. in 2013. Pre-event announcement by a Hackaday contributor "Eliot" stated it was brought by the same people as What the Hack 2005.

Like the previous Dutch hacker cons this event thrived by using its volunteers, and called everyone including the visitor sponsors a volunteer. Everyone was expected to do their part in making the event a success.

With over 170 talks and 3 large lecture halls, this edition was by far the largest in the series of quadrennial Dutch events.

The special side tents offering off-the-tracks program added to the open atmosphere which was manly driven by mixing technology, art and social aspects together. A custom camp currency (being copy-cat'ed using 3D printers), illuminated flying objects at night and lock picking contests during the day where accompanied by techno-DJs generating baselines from raw-network modulation data.

References

External links
 Official website

Free-software events
Hacker conventions
Nunspeet